Millstones or mill stones are stones used in gristmills, for grinding wheat or other grains. They are sometimes referred to as grindstones or grinding stones.

Millstones come in pairs: a stationary base with a convex rim known as the bedstone (or nether millstone) and a concave-rimmed runner stone that rotates. The movement of the runner on top of the bedstone creates a "scissoring" action that grinds grain trapped between the stones. Millstones are constructed so that their shape and configuration help to channel ground flour to the outer edges of the mechanism for collection.

The runner stone is supported by a cross-shaped metal piece (millrind or rynd) fixed to a "mace head" topping the main shaft or spindle leading to the driving mechanism of the mill (wind, water (including  tide) or other means).

History 

The earliest evidence for stones used to grind food is found in northern Australia, at the Madjedbebe rock shelter in Arnhem Land, dating back around 60,000 years. Grinding stones or grindstones, as they were called, were used by the Aboriginal peoples across the continent and islands, and they were traded in areas where suitable sandstone was not available in abundance. Different stones were adapted for grinding different things and varied according to location. One important use was for foods, in particular to grind seeds to make bread, but stones were also adapted for grinding specific types of starchy nuts, ochres for artwork, plant fibres for string, or plants for use in bush medicine, and are still used today. The Australian grindstones usually comprise a large flat sandstone rock (for its abrasive qualities), used with a top stone, known as a "muller", "pounder", or pestle. The Aboriginal peoples of the present state of Victoria used grinding stones to crush roots, bulbs, tubers and berries, as well as insects, small mammals and reptiles before cooking them.

Neolithic and Upper Paleolithic people in Europe used millstones to grind grains, nuts, rhizomes and other vegetable food products for consumption. These implements are often called grinding stones, and used either saddle stones or rotary querns turned by hand. Such devices were also used to grind pigments and metal ores prior to smelting.

In India, grinding stones (Chakki) were used to grind grains and spices. These consist of a stationary stone cylinder upon which a smaller stone cylinder rotates. Smaller ones, for household use, were operated by two people. Larger ones, for community or commercial use, used livestock to rotate the upper cylinder. Today a majority of the stone flour mills (Atta Chakki) are equipped with lower stone rotating and upper stone stationary millstones also called Shikhar Emery Stones which are made from abrasive emery grains and grits, with a binding agent similar to Sorel Cement. These stones are made from two types of emery abrasives - Natural Jaspar Red Emery or Synthetic Calcined Bauxite Black Emery.

In Korea, there were three different millstones, each made from different materials, serving other purposes, such as threshing, grinding, and producing starch. Generally, the handle of a millstone in Korea was made from an ash tree, the process for making a handle from the ash tree was known as “Mulpure-namu”. To ensure that everything is “all right” with the creation of a millstone, a mason within ancient Kora offered food and alcohol in a ritual. 

Millstones were introduced to Britain by the Romans during the 1st century AD and were widely used there from the 3rd century AD onwards.

Material 
The type of stone most suitable for making millstones is a siliceous rock called burrstone (or buhrstone), an open-textured, porous but tough, fine-grained sandstone, or a silicified, fossiliferous limestone. In some sandstones, the cement is calcareous.

Millstones used in Britain were of several types:

 Derbyshire Peak stones of grey Millstone Grit, cut from one piece, used for grinding barley; imitation Derbyshire Peak stones are used as decorative signposts at the boundaries of the Peak District National Park. Derbyshire Peak stones wear quickly and are typically used to grind animal feed since they leave stone powder in the flour, making it undesirable for human consumption.
 French buhrstones, used for finer grinding. French Burr comes from the Marne Valley in northern France. The millstones are not cut from one piece, but built up from sections of quartz cemented together, backed with plaster and bound with shrink-fit iron bands. Slots in the bands provide attachments for lifting.  In southern England the material was imported as pieces of rock, only assembled into complete millstones in local workshops. It was necessary to balance the completed runner stone with lead weights applied to the lighter side.
Composite stones, built up from pieces of emery, were introduced during the nineteenth century; they were found to be more suitable for grinding at the higher speeds available when auxiliary engines were adopted.

In Europe, a further type of millstone was used. These were uncommon in Britain, but not unknown:

 Cullen stones (stones from Cologne), a form of black lava quarried in the Rhine Valley at Mayen near Cologne, Germany.
 Lava stones from Orvieto (Italy), Mount Etna and Hyblaean Mounts (Sicily), and Pantelleria island, were used by the Romans.

Patterning
The surface of a millstone is divided by deep grooves called furrows into separate flat areas called lands. Spreading away from the furrows are smaller grooves called feathering or cracking. The grooves provide a cutting edge and help to channel the ground flour out from the stones.

The furrows and lands are arranged in repeating patterns called harps. A typical millstone will have six, eight or ten harps. The pattern of harps is repeated on the face of each stone, when they are laid face to face the patterns mesh in a kind of "scissoring" motion creating the cutting or grinding function of the stones. When in regular use stones need to be dressed periodically, that is, re-cut to keep the cutting surfaces sharp.

Millstones need to be evenly balanced, and achieving the correct separation of the stones is crucial to producing good quality flour. The experienced miller will be able to adjust their separation very accurately.

Grinding with millstones 

Grain is fed by gravity from the hopper into the feed-shoe. The shoe is agitated by a shoe handle running against an agitator (damsel) on the stone spindle, the shaft powering the runner stone. This mechanism regulates the feed of grain to the millstones by making the feed dependent on the speed of the runner stone. From the feed shoe the grain falls through the eye, the central hole, of the runner stone and is taken between the runner and the bed stone to be ground. The flour exits from between the stones from the side. The stone casing prevents the flour from falling on the floor, instead it is taken to the meal spout from where it can be bagged or processed further. 
The runner stone is supported by the rind, a cross-
shaped metal piece, on the spindle. The spindle is carried by the tentering gear, a set of beams forming a lever system, or a screw jack, with which the runner stone can be lifted or lowered slightly and the gap between the stones adjusted. The weight of the runner stone is significant (up to ) and it is this weight combined with the cutting action from the porous stone and the patterning that causes the milling process.

Millstones for some water-powered mills (such as Peirce Mill) spin at about 125 rpm.

Especially in the case of wind-powered mills the turning speed can be irregular. Higher speed means more grain is fed to the stones by the feed-shoe, and grain exits the stones more quickly because of their faster turning speed. The miller has to reduce the gap between the stones so more weight of the runner presses down on the grain and the grinding action is increased to prevent the grain being ground too coarsely. It has the added benefit of increasing the load on the mill and so slowing it down. In the reverse case the miller may have to raise the runner stone if the grain is milled too thoroughly making it unsuitable for baking. In any case the stones should never touch during milling as this would cause them to wear down rapidly. The process of lowering and raising the runner stone is called tentering and lightering. In many windmills it is automated by adding a centrifugal governor to the tentering gear.
Depending on the type of grain to be milled and the power available the miller may adjust the feed of grain to stones beforehand by changing the amount of agitation of the feed-shoe or adjusting the size of the hopper outlet.
Milling by millstones is a one-step process in contrast with roller mills in modern mass production where milling takes place in many steps. It produces wholemeal flour which can be turned into white flour by sifting to remove the bran.

Symbolism

Symbolism in the Bible 
Millstones were often essential objects within a community. For that reason, they gain multiple symbolic meanings and symbolism within mythology, folklore, and the bible. The Hebrew Bible admonishes (Deuteronomy 24:6): "No one shall take a lower millstone, nor an upper millstone, in pledge [for the payment of a debt], for that would be tantamount to taking away a life in pledge." The rabbis have explained that not only a millstone cannot be taken as security for a pledge, but anything in which the life of man depends cannot be taken as security for a pledge.

The Bible heavily utilized millstone symbolism within its various proverbs. A common one is the millstone’s proverbial designation of something as a great weight, as seen  in Matthew 18:6 
Likewise, due to the exhausting physical labor associated with the earliest millstones, they were symbolic of hard work and accredited as a menial task given to the lowest form of a laborer. This isn’t the only symbolic meaning of millstones within the Bible; millstones were also used as a symbol of civilization, prosperity, and comfortable living.

Other Symbolism 
Out of the bible, the Millstone can be seen as a symbol of transformation, death, and rebirth—due to the strenuous amount of work and effort that goes into utilizing a millstone to grind grain into flour. Other symbolic meanings associated with millstones include fertility and abundance. In Korea, a practice existed in which the husband would utilize a millstone while the wife was in childbirth, hoping that she could share her pain. Both the bible and folklore, the millstone can be associated with punishment. In some instances and stories, a millstone is used to harm an individual for their behavior. Examples of Millstones being used to punish individuals can be seen in “The Juniper Tree” and Judges 9:53, where one is used to kill Abimelech by tossing it on his head.

Heraldry 
In heraldry, as a demonstration of military bravado, a millstone features as the heraldic crest of John de Lisle, 2nd Baron Lisle (c.1318-1355), one of the founder knights of the Order of the Garter, as shown on his garter-plate in St George's Chapel, Windsor: A mill-stone argent pecked sable the inner circle and the rim of the second the fer-de-moline or. Thus symbolising super-human strength necessary to support such a weight atop his helmet.

In its more basic heraldic form it is a charge symbolising industry. The fer-de-moline ("mill-iron") or millrind, which attaches to the millstone and transfers to it the torque of the drive-shaft, is also a common heraldic charge, used as canting arms by families named Mills, Milles, Turner, etc.

See also 
 Bedrock mortar
 Edge mill
 Quern-stone
 Mühlsteinbrüche, historic millstone quarries in Saxony

References

External links 

 Millstone Dressing Tools
 European millstone quarries: a database
 Abandoned Millstones - Peak District
 Video clip demonstrating millstone dressing
 Millstones & Querns on Flickr

Grinding and lapping
Grinding mills
Food grinding tools
Stone objects
Heraldic charges